This is a list of all obelisks built after the 16th century. See List of obelisks in Rome, List of Egyptian obelisks for some ancient obelisks.

Modern obelisks
(Listed in date order)

17th century

18th century

19th century

20th century

21st century

References

External links